The W class are a diesel-hydraulic shunting locomotive ordered and operated by the Victorian Railways of Australia.

History
Tulloch, based in Rhodes, New South Wales, won the contract with an offer for West German-style locomotives, using a Mercedes V12 diesel engine developing  which was coupled to a Krupp 2W1D46 hydraulic transmission powering the centre axle, with the leading and trailing axles powered via connecting rods. All 25 engines entered service in the year from December 1959.

Tulloch expected a repeat order for a further 25 units from the Victorian Railways, and also built a standard gauge version numbered 7101 as a demonstrator unit for the New South Wales Railways. However, the latter system rejected the design as unsuitable, so that unit was sold to the Victorian Railways and used for construction trains on the Albury to Melbourne standard gauge line. After that project was completed, it became one of the standard gauge shunting units operating between South Dynon and Spencer Street station. The final engine, W267, had been built in anticipation of the repeat order that never eventuated - while the contract was written, it was never signed. Instead, the final engine was converted to standard gauge and shared duties with W266.

Engines were fitted with controls on both sides of the centre console, although that feature was removed not long after delivery.

The engines proved incredibly unpopular, due to problems with ride quality and engine reliability, and a transmission change needed to achieve mainline running speeds. The high gear setting was removed early on and the class relegated to shunting duties in an attempt to better utilise the fleet. However, the cab profile made visibility a problem in yards, and engine crews had to lean out the side to observe shunting instructions. The cab design also provided no shelter from the weather in storms or on hot days. Common failures included seized transmissions, oil leaking onto the shunters' steps creating a slip hazard, and failed engine blocks.

Between 1973 and 1977, at least ten engines, starting with W249, had the Mercedes engine removed and replaced with General Motors diesel units. Engines after the first had different exhaust arrangements, but all those refitted could be identified externally by a second exhaust stack at the end of the long hood, with the original adjacent to the driving cabin plated over. The alterations raised the engine hood by 208mm but did not replace the original transmission or gearbox.

The class was generally allocated to Ballarat, Geelong and Melbourne for short shunting trips, and one each at Ararat, Bendigo and Seymour, explicitly for yard work only. However, on the odd occasion, Seymour-based W241 was used on the Shepparton goods, and also ran out to Rushworth and Colbinabbin. It also made it to Benalla a few times.

New South Wales 71 class locomotive

The 71 class was a class of diesel locomotive operated by the New South Wales Department of Railways in Australia.

Powertrain
The locomotive was of the 0-6-0 wheel arrangement, fitted with a 12-cylinder Mercedes-Benz engine, Krupp hydraulic transmission and axle-gear and Behr hydraulic cooling equipment.

History
Having just completed 25   diesel-hydraulic shunting W class locomotives for the Victorian Railways, Tulloch Limited, with a view to receiving an order for similar units, offered the NSW Department of Railways a similar  version in 1960 for a 12-month testing period. The offer was accepted and the unit was taken into service on 11 November 1960, numbered 7101. Although allocated to Delec Locomotive Depot, all servicing was done at Tulloch Limited. No. 7101 was used on local transfer and shunting trips in the Sydney metropolitan area. It operated under conditions similar to the 70-class then in operation.

In mid-1961, Tulloch Limited was experiencing operating difficulties and was unable to fulfil its obligations in regard to the hiring. 7101 was returned on 21 June 1961 and sold to Victorian Railways, who used the locomotive from 4 July on the construction of the North East standard gauge line between Albury and Melbourne. It was repainted in the same colours as the 25 broad gauge units and renumbered W266.

Locomotives
Table details are drawn from Newsrail, December 1982 p. 311.

Model railways
Brass models of the W Class have been produced in HO Scale by Trainbuilder, including five each of the original (241-243, 251 and 265) and modified (241, 245, 257, 262 and 266), plus W250 as preserved, 7101 in Indian Red and W244 in the faux-V/Line livery.

As of mid-2019, IDR Models is producing ready-to-run HO Scale models of the class in both original and re-engined forms.

See also

 WAGR T class (diesel)

References 
 Vicrailways - W class

External links 
 victorianrailways.net - W class diesel hydraulic locomotives

Railway locomotives introduced in 1960
Standard gauge locomotives of Australia
Clyde Engineering locomotives
W class
W class (diesel)
C locomotives
Railway locomotives introduced in 1959
 
Tulloch Limited locomotives
Broad gauge locomotives in Australia
Shunting locomotives